Edward Richard Spieker Brander (21 July 1845 – 2 May 1883) was an English cricketer. Brander's batting style is unknown. He was born at Dartford, Kent.

Educated at Cheltenham College, where he played for the college cricket team, Brander made a single first-class appearance for the Orleans Club against the touring Australians in 1878 at the Orleans Club Ground. Batting once in the match, Brander was dismissed for 2 runs by Frank Allan in a match which ended in a draw.

Outside of cricket, Brander served in the East Surrey Regiment as a captain, serving from 1864 until his death at Southbourne, Hampshire on 2 May 1883.

References

External links
Edward Brander at ESPNcricinfo
Edward Brander at CricketArchive

1845 births
1883 deaths
Sportspeople from Dartford
People educated at Cheltenham College
English cricketers
Orleans Club cricketers
East Surrey Regiment officers
Sportspeople from Gloucestershire